Rafael Chagas Machado (born 1 April 1988), commonly known as Rafinha is a Brazilian professional footballer who plays for Náutico as a left back.

Club career
Born in Campo Mourão, Rafinha made his professional debut with Atlético Sorocaba in 2007. In the following years, he went on to represent Marília and Metropolitano.

On 13 May 2011, Rafinha moved abroad and joined Liechtensteiner club Vaduz on a one-year contract. On 4 August, he scored his first goal for the club in a 2–1 victory against Hapoel Tel Aviv in the UEFA Europa League qualifiers, although his side was eliminated due aggregate defeat. On 4 April 2012, he scored a goal in a 3–1 win against Triesenberg in Liechtenstein Cup, as a result of which his side progressed to the final of the  Cup.

After a stint with Metropolitano, Rafinha signed with Joinville on 25 April 2013. On 4 June, he scored his first goal for the club in a 2–0 victory against ASA.

In January 2014, Rafinha moved to Avaí. On 16 June, he moved to Vila Nova for the upcoming Série B.

After spending one season with Foz do Iguaçu in Série D, Rafinha switched to fellow league club side CSA on 21 November 2015. In his first season with the club, he provided ten assists, with his side winning promotion to Série C.

Rafinha played regularly during the 2018 Série B, with his side achieving promotion to Série A after finishing Série B as runners-up. His contract was also extended for 2019 in December.

Style of play
Although a left back, Rafinha can also play in the left midfield position.

Honours
Náutico
Campeonato Pernambucano: 2021

References

External links
Rafinha at playmakerstats.com (English version of ogol.com.br)

1988 births
Living people
Association football defenders
Brazilian footballers
Campeonato Brasileiro Série B players
Campeonato Brasileiro Série C players
Campeonato Brasileiro Série D players
Clube Atlético Sorocaba players
Marília Atlético Clube players
Clube Atlético Metropolitano players
Joinville Esporte Clube players
Avaí FC players
Vila Nova Futebol Clube players
Foz do Iguaçu Futebol Clube players
Centro Sportivo Alagoano players
Clube Náutico Capibaribe players
Swiss Challenge League players
FC Vaduz players
Expatriate footballers in Liechtenstein
Brazilian expatriate footballers
Brazilian expatriate sportspeople in Liechtenstein